Hadayat us Salikeen (is an Islamic religious text composed mainly of treatises by the Pakistani Sunni scholar and founder of Saifia TariqaAkhundzada Saif-ur-Rahman Mubarak on the merits of good deeds.

References

External links

Sunni literature